The Junction Canal was a canal in the states of New York and Pennsylvania in the United States. The canal was also called the Arnot Canal, after the name of its principal stockholder, John Arnot of Elmira, New York.

History
The canal was built and operated by a private stock company. Part of the canal was open and operating by 1854, but the entire length was not finished until 1858.

The intent was to lengthen the reach of the Chemung Canal deeper into Pennsylvania in order to connect to the canal systems there. Competition with railroads led to diminished use of the canal.  

In 1865 the canal was severely damaged by a flood. In 1866, the stock company was authorized to change its name to the "Junction Canal and Railroad Company," and work commenced in constructing a railroad on its right of way.

The canal was last used in 1871, and was then abandoned.

Points of interest

See also  
 List of canals in New York
 List of canals in the United States

References

External links
Pennsylvania Canal Society
American Canal Society
National Canal Museum

Transportation buildings and structures in Bradford County, Pennsylvania
Canals in New York (state)
Canals in Pennsylvania
Transportation in Chemung County, New York
Transportation in Tioga County, New York
Canals opened in 1854
1854 establishments in the United States